Snake & Mongoose is a 2013 American sports drama film directed by Wayne Holloway, starring Jesse Williams and Richard Blake as drag racers Don "The Snake" Prudhomme and Tom "The Mongoose" McEwen, respectively.

The film received a limited theatrical release in 20 cities between August 9 and November 4, 2013. Anchor Bay Films acquired the home entertainment rights and the film was released through video on demand and digital download on March 4, 2014, and on DVD and Blu-ray on April 8, 2014.

Premise
The film tells the story of the rivalry between drag racing drivers Don "The Snake" Prudhomme and Tom "The Mongoose" McEwen and their groundbreaking accomplishments in the world of drag racing.

The two help popularize the sport of drag racing when they team up in 1969 with Mattel's new Hot Wheels toy line, which had just hit the market the previous year. The partnership with Mattel helped revolutionize sports marketing.

Cast
 Jesse Williams as Don "The Snake" Prudhomme
 Richard Blake as Tom "The Mongoose" McEwen
 Fred Dryer as Ed Donovan
 Noah Wyle as Arthur Spear
 Tim Blake Nelson as Mike McAllister
 Ashley Hinshaw as Lynn Prudhomme
 Kim Shaw as Judy McEwen
 John Heard as Wally Parks
 Ian Ziering as Keith Black
 Joshua Leonard as Thomas Greer
 Sean Brosnan as Kenny Youngblood
 Leonardo Nam as Roland Leong

References

External links
 
 

2013 films
2013 drama films
2013 biographical drama films
2010s buddy drama films
2010s sports drama films
American auto racing films
American biographical drama films
American buddy drama films
American sports drama films
Rhino Films films
Sports films based on actual events
2010s English-language films
2010s American films